Glanmore Lake is a freshwater lake in the southwest of Ireland. It is located on the Beara Peninsula in County Kerry.

Geography

Hydrology and natural history
Glanmore Lake drains into the Croansaght River, which in turn flows to Kenmare Bay. The lake is a salmon and sea trout fishing destination.

See also
List of loughs in Ireland

References

Glanmore